The 26th Bersaglieri Battalion "Castelfidardo" is an active unit of the Italian Army's infantry corps' Bersaglieri speciality. Raised as XXVI Bersaglieri Battalion in 1859 the battalion became autonomous on 15 April 1977 and received the war flag and traditions of the 4th Bersaglieri Regiment.

History

Formation 
The XXVI Bersaglieri Battalion was raised in August 1859 and immediately distinguished itself at the Battle of Castelfidardo in 1860, earning a Bronze Medal of Military Valour. On 31 December 1861 the battalion entered the newly raised 4th Bersaglieri Regiment.

World War I 

During World War I the regiment fought on the Italian front, while the XXVI Battalion remained on garrison duty in Italian-occupied Rhodes since 1912.

World War II 
During World War II regiment and battalion were sent to Albania on 7 November 1940 to fight in the Greco-Italian War. Decimated by the strong Greek resistance and counteroffensive the regiment was reduced to the battalion-sized "Fast Reconnaissance Unit" on 12 April 1941. In this format the remnants of the regiment pursued the Greek armies, which had been forced to retreat after the German Wehrmacht had invaded Greece from Bulgaria on 6 April 1941. On 19 April the regiment's commanding officer Colonel Guglielmo Scognamiglio fell in a skirmish with the Greek rearguards at Borovë. For its conduct in Albania the regiment was awarded a Gold Medal of Military Valour. The death of the regiment's colonel is commemorated in the canton of its coat of arms by the azure band with three stars.

After the announcement of the Armistice of Cassibile on 8 September 1943 the 4th Bersaglieri Regiment and the XXVI Battalion were cut off in Dalmatia and forced to surrender to German forces. The regiment was raised again on 1 February 1944 with the XXI and XXXIII battalions, the latter of which had fought German forces on Corsica after the armistice. As part of the Italian Liberation Corps, the regiment fought on the allied side in the Italian campaign. After having sustained heavy losses fighting on the Winter Line and in the Battle of Ancona the regiment was reduced to Bersaglieri Battalion "Goito" on 24 September 1944 and transferred to the Combat Group "Legnano". After the war, the "Goito" battalion entered the 3rd Bersaglieri Regiment on 1 July 1946.

Cold War 
During the 1975 army reform the XII Bersaglieri Battalion of the 8th Bersaglieri Regiment was renamed 26th Bersaglieri Battalion "Castelfidardo" on 1 November 1975 and received the flag and traditions of the 4th Bersaglieri Regiment. The battalion was based in Pordenone and part of the 8th Mechanized Brigade "Garibaldi".

For its conduct and work after the 1976 Friuli earthquake the battalion was awarded a Silver Medal of Army Valour, which was affixed to the battalion's war flag and added to the battalion's coat of arms.

In the early 1980s the battalion moved to Maniago, where it remained until the Garibaldi was transferred to Caserta in Southern Italy in 1991. The Castelfidardo then joined the 132nd Armored Brigade "Ariete" for a short time, before its name was transferred to the 2nd (Recruits Training) Battalion "Pordenone" in Pordenone. For the next years, the Castelfidardo trained the recruits destined for the "Ariete" brigade, until the battalion was disbanded on 29 May 1998 and the flag of the 4th Bersaglieri Regiment transferred to the Shrine of the Flags in the Vittoriano in Rome.

2022 Reactivation 
On 4 October 2022 the flag and traditions of the 4th Bersaglieri Regiment were given to the Command and Tactical Supports Unit "Garibaldi" of the Bersaglieri Brigade "Garibaldi".

As of reactivation, the unit is organized as follows:

  4th Bersaglieri Command and Tactical Supports Unit, in Caserta
 Command Company
 Signal Company

See also 
 Bersaglieri

References

Bersaglieri Battalions of Italy